Georgia gained 2 seats in reapportionment after the 1800 census.  Elections were held October 4, 1802.

See also 
 December 1802 Georgia's at-large congressional district special election
 1802 and 1803 United States House of Representatives elections
 List of United States representatives from Georgia

Notes 

1802
Georgia
United States House of Representatives